Mikołaj Kunicki (1914–2001) was a Polish soldier, who also served in the German auxiliary units (Kompanieführer in Schutzmannschaft 104), and later became commander of the Polish-Soviet Rally Brigade Partisan (in the rank of captain).

Biography
In 1939 he participated in the September campaign. He fought to defend Warsaw. In 1939 he escaped from German captivity and returned to his family home. In 1942 he was called to serve in Schutzmannschaft, in Kobryn. From March to November 1942 he was in training at the German military school in Kobrin (sabotage-diversion). He graduated from the field of Feldwebel. After the attack of Ukrainian militias on Polish villages and then the refusal of the German command to retaliate against the Ukrainians, he and his company (150 soldiers) deserted.

In March 1943 he made contact with the Soviet partisans, and then joined them, killing the German commanders. He merged with the group of General Vasily Begma. On August 3, 1943, he took command of the United Polish Partisans unit. Tadeusz Kościuszko in Volhynia, subordinated to the General Staff in Moscow and to General Begma.

In July 1944 Kunicki merged his branch near Otryt in the Bieszczady Mountains with the branch of the Polish self-defense of Józef Pawłusiewicz. He also cooperated with the Soviet partisan unit under the command of Leonid Berenstein. Kunicki's unit fought numerous fights with smaller German units, the Ukrainian police, and then with the UPA.

Mikołaj Kunicki as a retired colonel lived in Zamość during the Polish People's Republic. After the World War 2, Kunicki published his memoirs.

References

1914 births
2001 deaths
Polish collaborators with Nazi Germany
Soviet partisans
Polish Army officers
Polish resistance members of World War II
Polish September Campaign participants